The following is a detailed discography of all singles released by American country music singer Waylon Jennings. A total of 16 Jennings' singles have reached number one on music charts.

As lead artist

1950s — 1960s

1970s

1980s

1990s — 2010s

As featured artist

Charted B-sides

Music videos

See also
The Highwaymen, for a discography of the supergroup consisting of Johnny Cash, Jennings, Kris Kristofferson, and Willie Nelson.
Old Dogs, for a discography of the supergroup consisting of Bobby Bare, Jennings, Jerry Reed, and Mel Tillis.

Notes

References

Country music discographies
Discographies of American artists